Parent Water Aerodrome  is located  south of Parent, Quebec, Canada.

See also
 Parent Airport

References

External links
Airport operator Cargair Ltd. (English site)

Registered aerodromes in Mauricie
Seaplane bases in Quebec